Pseudoclanis molitor is a moth from the family Sphingidae, which is known from open savanna and arid areas throughout tropical Africa.

The wingspan is 80–93 mm.

References

Smerinthini
Monotypic moth genera
Lepidoptera of the Democratic Republic of the Congo
Lepidoptera of West Africa
Lepidoptera of Uganda
Moths of Sub-Saharan Africa
Insects of the Central African Republic
Lepidoptera of Zimbabwe
Moths described in 1912